A food fight is a form of chaotic collective behavior, in which foodstuffs are thrown at others in the manner of projectiles. These projectiles are not made nor meant to harm others, but to simply ignite a fight filled with spontaneous food throwing. Food fights may be impromptu examples of rebellion or violence; however, they can also be planned events. In organized food fights, the food "weapons" are usually all of one kind, or of a limited variety. An impromptu food fight will use whatever food is on hand.

Though usually associated with juvenile settings such as schools, food fights have a long history throughout the world as a form of festive public entertainment or pastime. They have traditionally been popular since the early Middle Ages in Europe during seasonal festivals, especially in the summertime. For example, Spanish "La Tomatina" is still regularly held every August in the Valencian town of Buñol, in which participants pelt each other with tomatoes, as is Battle of the Oranges held in the Italian town of Ivrea where, as the name would suggest, the oranges are used instead. As an example from outside of Europe, the Chinese "Tofu Festival" can be mentioned. It is held on the 13th day of the first month of the lunar calendar in Shegangxia village, Fogang County, Guangdong Province. Slabs of tofu are thrown at each other.

Food fights have occurred in the meetings of the Legislative Yuan of Taiwan.

Food fights have also become a common element in slapstick comedy, with the pie in the face gag being especially well-known. Food fights are frequently featured in children's television and books, usually as an example of childish, destructive or reckless behavior. Movies with notable food fights include Animal House (1978) and Blazing Saddles (1974). A custard pie fight was filmed for Dr. Strangelove (1964), but was cut before the final print.

See also
 Food loss and waste

References

Group processes
Food fight
Fight play